The Good Luck Joes is a band originally from East Grand Rapids, Michigan and is currently on the Milwaukee, Wisconsin-based Third Ward Records label. The band consists of Andrew Martin on lead vocals and guitar, Andrew Krei on lead guitar and backing vocals, Joe Scheltema on bass guitar and backing vocals, Peterson Goodwyn on drums/percussion, and Andrew Citron on keyboards/piano.

History
The band began to practice together in 2002.

In 2004 they released the first album, self-titled "The Good Luck Joes". The album circulated among a relatively small group of people, and the band remained relatively unknown.  In 2005, with the help of Milwaukee-based producer Joe Puerta, the band recorded a 5-song EP entitled "48 Hours EP", featuring the title track "48 Hours".  After receiving the encouragement of numerous musicians and industry professionals, the band enlisted the services of LA-based producer Chad Fischer (Lazlo Bane, Cary Brothers, Alexi Murdoch, Colin Hay) to assist in the creation of their second full-length album, "What Do You Think of That Noise?". The album was released in 2006, and the band subsequently embarked on a tour, opening for the 80's synth-pop outfit ABC at venues including the House of Blues Chicago and Cleveland, Hard Rock Cafe (Myrtle Beach), Ram's Head Live (Baltimore), and Canal Room (NYC). Other bands they have performed with include Colin Hay, Thomas Dolby, The English Beat, Naked Eyes, The Click 5, Tommy Keene, The White Tie Affair, and nationally recognized acoustic-rock act Down the Line. In September 2006, their lead song from "What Do You Think...?", "Middle of Me", was used in promo spots for the ABC show Six Degrees and the band made some national waves.

In November 2006, the band previewed 4 new songs for the first time at the Point's East Pub. Over the first few months of 2007, the band released these songs, as well as one other, through their website.  On June 5, 2007, the songs, officially compiled as Why Everything Goes Wrong, was entirely released on their website, and is now available on iTunes.

In Summer 2007 the band performed at Milwaukee's Summerfest, MOBfest in Chicago, and an opening gig for Soul Asylum in August. In early 2008 they released an iTunes-only EP, entitled Two Drifters EP, containing a new single, "Two Drifters", and an acoustic version of their wildly popular song, "Middle of Me".

In 2009, The Good Luck Joes won Fox Sports Detroit's April in the D contest  The band won, by fan vote, the chance to make a music video for their song that can be seen throughout April on Fox Sports Detroit. They appeared at the Detroit Tigers home opener party on April 10 at The Fillmore Detroit and their song can be heard on Detroit radio station WRIF.

In addition to their songs having appeared on ABC and Fox Sports, The Good Luck Joes' music has been on a number of Real World and Road Rules episodes (MTV), Kyle XY and Greek (ABC Family), Epic Conditions (Weather Channel), Wave Chasers (Travel Channel), Keeping Up With the Kardashians (E!), and most recently, in a commercial for the Jennifer Aniston/Aaron Eckhart movie, "Love Happens".  Their entire catalog is available on iTunes.

Discography

Studio albums
The Good Luck Joes (2004)
What Do You Think of That Noise? (2006)

EPs
48 Hours EP (2005)
Why Everything Goes Wrong (2007)
Two Drifters EP (2008)

Singles
"April in the D" (2009)

External links
The Good Luck Joes' Official Homepage
The band's MySpace:
The band's YouTube account

References

Indie rock musical groups from Michigan
Musical groups from Grand Rapids, Michigan